Miguel Muñoz Fernández (born 22 November 1996) is a Spanish professional footballer who plays as a central defender for Polish club Piast Gliwice.

Club career
Born in Madrid, Muñoz represented Rayo Vallecano and Deportivo de La Coruña as a youth. On 28 December 2015, he moved to Tercera División side Silva SD on loan for the remainder of the season.

In 2016, Muñoz moved to another reserve team, Deportivo Alavés B also in the fourth division. On 15 July of the following year, he signed a contract with Segunda División B team UD San Sebastián de los Reyes, but featured sparingly during the campaign.

On 12 July 2018, Muñoz moved to fellow third division side AD Unión Adarve, and was a regular starter as the club suffered relegation. He returned to Sanse on 4 January 2020, after six months without a club.

On 14 June 2020, Muñoz agreed to a one-year contract with Real Murcia, still in the third level. On 8 June of the following year, he moved abroad and joined Polish Ekstraklasa side Piast Gliwice on a two-year deal.

Muñoz made his professional debut on 12 September 2021, coming on as a late substitute for Ariel Mósor in a 0–1 home loss against Zagłębie Lubin.

References

External links

1996 births
Living people
Footballers from Madrid
Spanish footballers
Association football defenders
Segunda División B players
Tercera División players
Deportivo Fabril players
Deportivo Alavés B players
UD San Sebastián de los Reyes players
Real Murcia players
Ekstraklasa players
Piast Gliwice players
Spanish expatriate footballers
Spanish expatriate sportspeople in Poland
Expatriate footballers in Poland